Körnerstraße is an underground station on the Cologne Stadtbahn lines 3 and 4 in Cologne. The station lies on Venloer Straße, corner Körnerstraße in the district of Ehrenfeld.

The station was opened in 1989 and consists of a mezzanine and one island platform with two rail tracks.

Notable places nearby 
 Venloer Straße
 Neptunbad
 Church of St. Joseph
 Church of the Assumption

See also 
 List of Cologne KVB stations

References

External links 
 
 station info page 

Cologne KVB stations
Ehrenfeld, Cologne
Railway stations in Germany opened in 1989
1989 establishments in West Germany
Cologne-Bonn Stadtbahn stations